The Best of Ray Stevens is the name of:

The Best of Ray Stevens (1967 album)
The Best of Ray Stevens (1968 album)
The Best of Ray Stevens (1997 album)